"Misunderstood" is an English inspirational song written and composed by Fijian singer and songwriter Savuto Vakadewavosa and Fijian Composer DJ Ritendra, This song was a collaboration between DJ Ritendra and Savuto Vakadewavosa and the song is about misunderstanding in friendship, the support vocals on this track was recorded by Darxide DJ and the track was produced and released in 2016. under Lewavesi production and the official remix version of the track was also mixed by DJ Ritendra and released in 2016, this single also won the Most Popular Music Video Award at 2018 Fiji Performing Rights Association Music Awards.

Background 
In an Interview released by Local Newspaper Fiji Times, Savuto Vakadewavosa discuss the song as "The song is about how painful it is or how much it got to me when friends of mine made assumptions about my decisions without trying to understand it," and "I felt so helpless and it got me down for a long time".

Track listing

Remix
Both the Original and Official Remix version of "Misunderstood" was released on 16 May 2016, under Lewavesi Production, this version of the track features hardcore Electronic dance music mixed by DJ Ritendra.

Music video 
DJ Ritendra and Savuto Vakadewavosa released the official music video of "Misunderstood" on 11 March 2017, The music video was broadcast on the national television in 'The Groove Thang' and ''Breakfast at Fiji One" show. DJ Ritendra also published the music video on his official Facebook page and released it on Vevo on 16 March 2017. The music video was received very well by the audience and the critics. and received the Most Popular Music Video Award at 2018 Fiji Performing Rights Association Music Awards.

Awards

Fiji Performing Rights Association Music Awards

References

External links
 Misunderstood Official Music Video On VEVO.
 Misunderstood Remix On VEVO.

2016 singles
2016 songs
Savuto Vakadewavosa songs